John DeStefano could refer to:

 John M. DeStefano (died 2008), American artist
 John DeStefano Jr. (born 1955), American politician from Connecticut
 Johnny DeStefano, counselor to U.S. President Donald Trump

See also
 Giovanni Di Stefano (disambiguation)